The Hwasong-17 is a North Korean two-stage ICBM, first unveiled on 10 October 2020, the 75th anniversary of the founding of the Workers' Party of Korea (WPK) parade. This missile is the latest iteration of North Korea's intercontinental ballistic missile (ICBM) program. The Japanese Ministry of Defence estimates its operational range at 15,000 km or more. Unlike its predecessors, the Hwasong-17 may be capable of carrying multiple warheads. North Korea claimed the first Hwasong-17 was successfully launched on 24 March 2022. Western analysts instead believe the 24 March launch was an earlier missile design, and a later test that took place on 18 November 2022 was in fact the first successful test launch.

Description 

The Hwasong-17 is assumed to be a two-stage, liquid fuelled road-mobile ICBM carried by a 22-wheeled transporter erector launcher (TEL) vehicle. The missile itself is judged from images to be 26 m long with a diameter of 2.7 m. The exact capabilities of the missile are as yet unconfirmed, though speculation by experts has fueled questions as to whether it could reach cities within the United States and potentially evade U.S. missile defenses too. It also might have the capability of carrying multiple re-entry vehicles (MRVs), which would be a less expensive way to launch multiple warheads than deploying many ICBMs with single warhead payloads. The size and configuration of the 11-axle TEL indicates North Korea has developed a domestic capacity to manufacture such vehicles, a matter of concern to observers as attempting to block procurement of foreign-built TELs was one limitation on the nation's ICBM force. The country being able to produce their own launchers lifts that constraint and enables them to have the capacity to fire greater numbers of missiles.

Japan's defense minister Yasukazu Hamada estimated the operational range of the Hwasong-17 as 15,000 km or more, if mounted with a sufficiently light warhead. Ankit Panda of the Carnegie Endowment for International Peace agreed that if the successful November missile test had been fired at the US instead of up into the air, it could easily reach anywhere in the continental United States. An alleged unsuccessful test-flight of 2 November 2022 had suggested the Hwasong-17 might be unreliable. As of November 2022, it is unknown how much a large (for example, MRV) warhead would reduce Hwasong-17 range, and it is also unknown whether North Korean ICBM technology has the ability to deliver a warhead that survives re-entry into the atmosphere.

Since the Hwasong-15 was already capable of striking most of the contiguous United States, the development of an even larger missile suggests North Korea is pursuing MRV, or even MIRV, payloads. As of 2020, the Ground-Based Midcourse Defense system comprises 44 interceptors, requiring the launch of at least four to guarantee a hit, enabling it to protect against a maximum of 11 warheads. The Hwasong-17 may contain three or four warheads, or potentially a mix of decoys and real warheads, so the launch of just a few missiles would be enough to overwhelm U.S. defenses. Despite posing such a threat, the missile is greatly limited by its sheer size. The combined weight of the missile and its TEL restricts movement to North Korea's limited network of paved roads, as it would only be able to travel short distances on unpaved roads and only on sturdy ground. Unlike smaller liquid-fueled ballistic missiles, it is unlikely that it can be fueled at a secure location and then driven to and erected at a pre-surveyed site to cut down on launch preparation time, as vibrations during movement of such a large missile would risk causing damage and leaking volatile fuel. This restricts fueling to once it arrives at the launch site itself, a process requiring several hours to complete, leaving the missile exposed and vulnerable to pre-launch attack. The Hwasong-17's multiple warhead capability is also speculative, as it requires complex guidance and warhead release mechanisms needing significant flight testing to ensure reliability, and no test launches had been conducted by the time of its public unveiling.

In August 2021, commander of United States Northern Command Glen D. VanHerck stated that the "KN-28 missile has a much larger capability, and the total number of missiles tends to increase." This suggests that Hwasong-17 is designated as KN-28, not the KN-27.

With its alleged test flight in March 2022, WPK general secretary Kim Jong-un stressed the development of the missile as a 'a symbol of Juche power and fruition of self-reliance, [was] completed as a core strike means and a reliable nuclear war deterrence means of the DPRK strategic forces'.

The Hwasong-17 may also contribute to ICBM testing by acting as a satellite launch vehicle (SLV). North Korea has only fired long-range ballistic missiles on lofted trajectories, in part because tracking can only be done from land-based sensors. The ability to receive data signals is lost at a certain distance and altitude due to the Earth's curvature, and they lack ships or planes to continue monitoring an RV beyond those distances. The Hwasong-17 has more capable rocket motors and more energetic liquid propellants than country's previous Taepodong-2/Unha-3 booster, making it able to launch a satellite twice as heavy as was previously possible into low Earth orbit; the missile's first launches were claimed to be related to testing elements for a reconnaissance satellite. As an SLV, it could launch a satellite that would be in a position to monitor future ICBM flights and payload reentry from space, enabling more realistic testing by firing them on normal trajectories out to further distances.

History
At the Self-Defence-2021 exhibition, the missile was shown labeled as the Hwasong-17.

Test launches of the Hwasong-17 were carried out first on 26 February 2022, and again on 4 March. North Korea did not publicize news of the launches, with INDOPACOM revealing them later. The United States believed the tests were not intended to demonstrate the ICBM's range but conduct early evaluations of its capabilities. North Korea publicly claimed the launches were intended to test components of a reconnaissance satellite at operational altitudes without disclosing they had been lofted by the new ICBM. It is possible the launches were done to test both satellite components and the ICBM, but only the former was admitted to limit potential international criticism. Missile expert Jeffrey Lewis also raised the possibility that these were launches of the post-boost vehicle for the second stage of the Hwasong-17. A missile launch was attempted on 16 March 2022, but it was a failure. It is suspected that it was a Hwasong-17 test, but was not acknowledged by North Korea due to the unsuccessful launch.

A test launch of a disputed missile type was carried out by North Korea on 24 March 2022. The launch was a technical success that broke many records for North Korea, for example regarding height and flight time. The footage of the launch may have been doctored, with missile analysts being unable to confirm that the missile that was launched on 24 March was a Hwasong-17, due to inconsistencies with objects in the background of the launch, which matched to satellite imagery on an earlier date than 24 March. Two shots of the observation bus that Kim Jong-un was in appeared to be taken in different locations and grass that was burnt in a controlled burn appeared to be unburnt on Korean Central Television footage. South Korean intelligence alleges that the missile launched on 24 March was likely an improved and modified Hwasong-15, though NK News also stated that there may be other reasons for using old footage, such as a camera failure.

At a parade on 8 February 2023 marking the 75th anniversary of the Korean People’s Army, twelve Hwasong-17s on mobile launchers were displayed. Depending on the exact number of missiles and potential multiple reentry vehicles, North Korea could technically have reached the point where they have enough ICBMs carrying enough warheads to overwhelm the existing amount of GMD interceptors, although no multiple warhead tests had yet been conducted.

Test launches

See also
Hwasong-14
Hwasong-15
DF-5

References 

Intercontinental ballistic missiles of North Korea
Military equipment introduced in the 2020s